Virgil Chapel Ledbetter (March 7, 1918 – August 11, 1967) was an American football and baseball coach. He served as the head football coach at Samford University (then known as Howard University) in Homewood, Alabama from 1957 to 1958, compiling a record of 6–10–1. Ledbetter was also the school's head baseball coach from 1956 to 1965.

Head coaching record

Football

References

External links
 

1918 births
1967 deaths
Arkansas State Red Wolves football players
Basketball coaches from Alabama
Samford Bulldogs football players
Samford Bulldogs football coaches
Samford Bulldogs men's basketball coaches
Samford Bulldogs baseball coaches
People from Walker County, Alabama
Players of American football from Alabama